The Item, formerly known as The Sumter Daily Item and The Daily Item, is an independent, morning newspaper published in Sumter, South Carolina five days a week, Tuesday to Friday with a "Weekend Edition" delivered on Saturday mornings, by Osteen Publishing Company. It has a circulation of approximately 20,000.

History
The paper, then called The Sumter Daily Item, was first published on October 15, 1894, by Hubert Graham Osteen. It previously had been operated as The Watchman and Southron (a merger of Sumter Watchman and True Southron). It was South Carolina's first small-town newspaper. Osteen served as the paper's editor and publisher until his retirement in 1946.

In 2008, the paper changed its Monday edition to a tabloid format before abandoning the Monday edition altogether. However, the paper's website is updated each Monday, with news and obituaries.

The paper covers Sumter, Lee and Clarendon counties, with a dedicated bureau located in Manning which publishes a weekly section, "The Clarendon Sun," each Tuesday. Lakeside, magazine covering the Sumter, Clarendon, Orangeburg, Berkeley and Calhoun County areas of Lake Marion is also published six times a year.

Staff

Newsroom 

CONTENT TEAM:
News Editor Rhonda Barrick
Features Editor Ivy Moore
Sports Editor Dennis Brunson
Senior Staff Writer Bruce Mills
Staff Writer Adrienne Sarvis
Staff Writer Jim Hilley
Sports Writer Justin Driggers
Archivist Sammy Way
Newsclerk/Librarian Sandra Holbert

See also
Sumter News

References

External links
 The Item website

Newspapers published in South Carolina
Sumter, South Carolina
Publications established in 1894